Isana is a genus of moths of the family Erebidae. The genus was erected by Francis Walker in 1859.

Species
Isana albifascia (Hampson, 1929) Meghalaya
Isana albiscripta Holloway, 2008 Borneo
Isana apicimacula (Wileman, 1915) Formosa
Isana bilineata (Wileman & South, 1919) Formosa
Isana duplicifasciata (Hampson, 1895) Sikkim
Isana eugenes (Prout, 1928) Borneo
Isana indentifascia (Swinhoe, 1906) Meghalaya
Isana irregularusalis Holloway, 2008 Borneo
Isana kinabaluensis Holloway, 2008 Borneo
Isana larusalis Walker, [1859] Borneo, Peninsular Malaysia
Isana muluensis Holloway, 2008 Borneo
Isana nigrisigna (Wileman, 1915) Formosa
Isana perdentalis (Hampson, 1898) Meghalaya
Isana quadrilateralis Holloway, 2008 Borneo
Isana satyrata (Strand, 1920) Formosa, Japan
Isana stigmatalis (Moore, 1867) Bengal
Isana vialis (Moore, 1882) Darjeeling

References

Herminiinae